Slovenia competed in the 1998 Winter Olympics in Nagano, Japan. The country earned no medals.

Alpine skiing

Men

Men's combined

Women

Biathlon

Men

Men's 4 × 7.5 km relay

Women

Women's 4 × 7.5 km relay

 1 A penalty loop of 150 metres had to be skied per missed target.
 2 One minute added per missed target.

Cross-country skiing

Women

 2 Starting delay based on 5 km results. 
 C = Classical style, F = Freestyle

Figure skating

Women

Freestyle skiing

Men

Nordic combined 

Men's individual

Events:
 normal hill ski jumping
 15 km cross-country skiing

Ski jumping 

Men's team large hill

 1 Four teams members performed two jumps each.

Snowboarding

Women's giant slalom

References
Official Olympic Reports
 Olympic Winter Games 1998, full results by sports-reference.com

Nations at the 1998 Winter Olympics
Winter Olympics
1998 Winter Olympics